Jonathan Frankel (July 15, 1935 in London – May 7, 2008 in Jerusalem) was a historian and writer. He was a lecturer at the Hebrew University of Jerusalem from 1964 to 1985, and a professor between 1985 and 2004.

Influence
Frankel was a noted historian of Modern Jewry, as testified in many obituaries: “the most highly regarded historian of modern Jewry of his generation” (Steven Zipperstein, The Independent); “arguably the greatest historian of modern Jewry of his generation” (The Times); “a brilliant historian of Russian and Jewish history” (David Cesarani, The Guardian,).

Frankel contributed to the historiography of East European Jewish life with his book Prophecy and Politics: Socialism, Nationalism, and the Russian Jews, 1862–1917 (1982), which became a classic at the moment of its publication. This work approached Jewish history of the nineteenth and early twentieth century from a completely new perspective. 

He is credited with having "helped establish the Department of Russian and Slavic Studies" at Hebrew University of Jerusalem.

Family
Frankel married Edith Rogovin in 1963; they have two daughters.

Books
 Vladimir Akimov on the Dilemmas of Russian Marxism 1895-1903: The Second Congress of the Russian Social Democratic Labour Party. Cambridge University Press, 1969.
 Prophecy and Politics: socialism, nationalism and the Russian Jews, 1862-1917. Cambridge University Press, 1984,  1984. — 686 pages (translated into Hebrew, Italian and Russian).
 The Damascus Affair: 'Ritual Murder', Politics, and the Jews in 1840. Cambridge University Press, 1997. — 491 pages. —   (Review / Middle East Quarterly, Volume 13 / September 1, 1998) (translated into Hebrew).
 Social Radicalism: “Jewish Socialism” and Jewish Labour Movement in Eastern Europe, Open University of Israel, 2007 (in Hebrew).
 Crisis, Revolution, and Russian Jews. Cambridge University Press, 2009.

Other works
 Jonathan Frankel, Jewish politics and the Russian Revolution of 1905, Tel-Aviv, Tel Aviv University, 1982 (21 pages)

Obituaries 
 Steven J. Zipperstein, "Remembering Our Colleagues: Jonathan Frankel (1935 - 2008)," Association for Jewish Studies, January 2008. 
 Vladimir Levin, Professor Jonathan Frankel (1935-2008), Journal East European Jewish Affairs, Volume 38, Issue 3, December 2008, pp. 251 - 252.
 Semion Gol’din and Vladimir Levin, "In memoriam of Jonathan Frankel," in: Arkhiv evreiskoi istorii, Vol. 5 (2008), pp. 347–351 (in Russian).
 Eli Lederhendler, "In Memoriam: Jonathan Frankel, 1935–2008," American Jewish History, July 2009, 94 (3), pp. 225-227.
 Jonathan Frankel - Thought-provoking contributor to Jewish and Russian history
 Professor Jonathan Frankel: Historian of Russia and modern Jewry

References

1935 births
2008 deaths
Academic staff of the Hebrew University of Jerusalem
Historians of Jews and Judaism
British historians of religion
British male non-fiction writers
20th-century British historians
21st-century British historians